You and Me Against the World is a 2003 Philippine action film written and directed by Jose N. Carreon. The film stars Robin Padilla and Kris Aquino. This is FLT Films' last film produced before entering a 3-year hiatus.

Cast
 Robin Padilla as Paolo Guerrero
 Kris Aquino as Diana Rivero
 Elizabeth Burton as Kristine Cortez
 Mark Anthony Fernandez as Arnold Torrevilla
 Gary Estrada as Rocky
 Ricky Davao as Montes
 Ricardo Cepeda as Capt. Adolfo
 Rommel Padilla as Vincent
 Patrick Guzman as Lt. Rodrigo
 Bearwin Meily as Dirty Harry
 Jackie Aquino as Irene Rivera-Cortez
 Maritoni Fernandez as Celine Guerrero
 Alexia Alvarez as Aimee
 MJ Maranan as Henry Cortez
 Ramil Rodriguez as Mr. Torrevilla
 Ernie Forte as Mang Frankie
 Sol Carreon as Judge
 Ryan Quilala as Defense Lawyer
 Kim Flaminiano as Defense Lawyer

References

External links

2003 films
2003 action films
Filipino-language films
Philippine action films
FLT Films films